Hawksley Workman (Born Ryan Corrigan, March 4, 1975) is a Canadian rock singer-songwriter who has garnered critical acclaim for his blend of cabaret pop and glam rock.  Workman has released eleven full-length albums throughout his career. A multi-instrumentalist, he plays guitar, drums, bass, keyboards and sings on his records, often switching between those instruments when playing live.

Workman is a prolific artist, usually writing, recording, mastering and releasing entire albums in the span of a few weeks. He explains, "A lot of artists I know they get a year and a half away from a record they've just made it's like ... 'Oh ... it's terrible I hate that thing,' ya know? When I record [a] record, I never take more than a day per song... so by the time the record is mixed, finished, complete, done... I'm still in a honeymoon with the record ..."

His music has been featured on the television shows Scrubs, Being Human, Falcon Beach, Queer as Folk and Whistler.

Workman produces and engineers much of his own recording, and has produced albums for other artists as well.

In addition, Workman has taken supporting roles as an actor in Michael McGowan's films Score: A Hockey Musical and Still Mine.

In 2013 Workman formed a band, Mounties, with Ryan Dahle (Limblifter) and Steve Bays (Hot Hot Heat). Their debut album, Thrash Rock Legacy, was released on March 4, 2014 on Light Organ Records.

Periods and albums

Beginnings (1998)
Workman was born in Huntsville in the Muskoka region of Ontario, attending Almaguin Highlands Secondary School and later Huntsville High School. He later moved south, to Toronto, to pursue his musical career. It was then that he started using the stage name Hawksley Workman instead of his original name, Ryan Corrigan.

In 1998 Workman says he was, "just beginning to find my voice."  He recorded first in the front entrance of a friend's studio, then moved his studio "to the basement of a friend's recently deceased grandmother on Hillsdale Avenue" – this basement is where he recorded his early albums For Him and the Girls and (Last Night We Were) The Delicious Wolves, as well as material that was released several years later on Before We Were Security Guards and Puppy (A Boy's Truly Rough).

In that studio, Hawksley Workman engineered and produced albums for other musicians.  He worked with many artists during this time, which played a role in the development of his production skills early in his career.

For Him and the Girls (1999–2000)

Workman released his first album in 1999 on his own label, Isadora Records and through Loose Music in Europe.  This album, titled, For Him and the Girls, earned him comparisons to the likes of Tom Waits, Rheostatics and Harry Nilsson.

Workman has been known for his unusual and creative promotional materials as well as his music. Around the time of his debut release, he published a number of letters to "Isadora", a fictional lover, in the classified section of Toronto's NOW. (These letters were later published by ECW Press as the book Hawksley Burns for Isadora.)

In 2000, Workman collaborated on an album called Chrome Reflection, credited to a band named Bird which also featured fellow Canadians Jason Collett and Andrew Cash. The album also featured performances by most of Workman's then current live band.

(Last Night We Were) The Delicious Wolves (2001–2002)
Workman's second album was released in 2001 through Isadora Records/Universal Music Canada.  The album, titled (Last Night We Were) The Delicious Wolves, became Workman's breakthrough record both in Canada and Europe, spawning the singles "Striptease" and "Jealous of Your Cigarette".

His record company press kit for The Delicious Wolves included such fanciful biographical details as sailing through the air on a kite, and learning music while working as a janitor at a tap dance academy.

At the end of 2001, he also released an EP of self-penned Christmas-themed songs, Almost a Full Moon.

In 2002, Workman was awarded the Juno Award for Best New Solo Artist and also received the award for Best Video for "Jealous of Your Cigarette".

Lover/Fighter (2003–2005)
Lover/Fighter followed in 2003; the album included the hits "We Will Still Need a Song", "Smoke Baby", "Anger as Beauty", "Even an Ugly Man" and "No Reason to Cry Out Your Eyes (On the Highway Tonight)".  The album was recorded in an old schoolhouse in Muskoka, which Workman converted into a recording studio.

"Anger As Beauty" was released in 2003 just prior to the LP release, Lover/Fighter. It includes a radio edit of the single "Anger as Beauty", and "Love Will Tear Us Apart", a cover of Joy Division.

The same year Workman was featured, with recording artists Jully Black and Sam Roberts, in a multi-award-winning MuchMusic social-issue documentary "Inside Your Threads", by Tania Natscheff and Liz Marshall.   Workman and Black travelled to Bangladesh to witness the living and working conditions of garment workers making clothes for the North American market.

Live in Lille, released in 2004, is a DVD of a live performance performed in Lille, France, that showcases his live musicianship.

In 2004 Workman also released Before We Were Security Guards, an album he originally recorded in 1998.  The album was originally only available at live shows, but is now available to order through his website.

Additionally, in 2005 Workman released Serena Ryder's album, Unlikely Emergency through his label, Isadora Records.

Treeful of Starling (2006)

Treeful of Starling was released on February 28, 2006, a quiet retreat compared to the more high energy Lover/Fighter.

In late 2006, Workman released two tour albums.  "Puppy", which was recorded between "For Him and the Girls" and "(Last Night We Were) The Delicious Wolves" and "My Little Toothless Beauties", recorded shortly after "Lover/Fighter" in 2004.  They are only available for purchase at live shows, through the band's website, or on the internet as MP3 albums.

Between the Beautifuls (2008)

Between the Beautifuls was released in early 2008, and soon followed by a single titled "Piano Blink" produced by Martin "Doc" McKinney.

In May 2008 Workman contributed a track to Cartier's Cartier LOVE campaign, which has collected songs by many musicians from around the world.  Workman's contribution is called "The Ground That We Stand On".  In addition to that song, Workman also wrote and produced a duet performed by himself and Oscar winner Marion Cotillard.  That song is called "The Strong Ones".

Los Manlicious (2008)
Following on the heels of Between the Beautifuls is an initially Europe exclusive release titled Los Manlicious, which was released in May 2008, and in Canada on August 26, 2008.

The record was recorded in the same sessions as Between the Beautifuls and Workman intended to release it first, but Universal Music preferred to release the mellower album first. Los Manlicious is a return to Hawksley's heavier rock roots, resembling his major label debut, (Last Night We Were) The Delicious Wolves more than his two previous albums, Treeful of Starling and Between the Beautifuls.  As well as Workman himself (credited as HW), several producers were enlisted for this album:  Martin "Doc" McKinney, Andre Wahl, Bob Ezrin, John Southworth, Ken Friesen, Matt DeMatteo, James Paul.

The first single from this album is "When You Gonna Flower?" Los Manlicious' final track, "Fatty Wants to Dance" has been remixed by The Paronomasiac.

While on tour in Europe supporting the record, Workman recorded videos for eight of its 13 tracks.  These videos were shot on location in various cities on the tour and can be watched on YouTube or on Workman's Facebook page.

Milk and Meat (2010)
Workman released two albums in 2010: Meat was released on January 19, 2010, and Milk was released in Canada on August 10, 2010  after being released digitally over the course of five months.

Full Moon Eleven (2011)
Workman's Christmas record titled "Full Moon Eleven" was released in November 2011.  "Full Moon Eleven" was a rerecording and re-imagining of his original Christmas album, "Almost a Full Moon," which was recorded in Paris and released 10 years prior.

Songs from the god that comes (2013)
In 2013 Workman released Songs from the god that comes. The album is the soundtrack to a stage performance he created with 2b Theatre Company.

Old Cheetah (2015)
On June 2, 2015, Workman released Old Cheetah. According to his website in a post to the Front page on May 25 by Alex Hudson, "The 12-song effort is theatrical and ambitious. Workman’s signature eclecticism shines brightly on songs like '1000 Miles of Atmosphere,' a nine-and-a-half-minute prog epic that’s stuffed with syncopated rhythms, star-dazzled synth twinkles and unpredictable sonic shifts."

Median Age Wasteland (2019)
Workman released his latest album titled Median Age Wasteland, a blend of folk and country.

Hawksley's band
Workman has played live in many configurations.  His minimal setup consists of a duo, with Todd Lumley ("Mr. Lonely") playing piano and keyboards alongside Hawksley Workman on the guitar and vocals. During his 2008 tour in support of "Between the Beautifuls" Workman played with a larger band and sang while switching between drums and guitar.

Workman's recent configuration for more traditional rock songs consists of the following:

 Hawksley Workman – vocals, guitar
 Todd Lumley ("Mr. Lonely") – piano, organ, keyboards
 Derrick Brady – bass guitar
 Jesse Zubot – guitar & violin
 Brad Kilpatrick – drums

Guitar equipment

Workman revealed his choices for guitars and equipment in an interview with Australian Guitar Magazine in January 2006.

 Squier 1952 Telecaster reissue – early 1980s model, JV series, made in Japan
 Gibson Les Paul Standard – early 1970s model, ebony finish, Bigsby vibrato tailpiece
 Gibson Les Paul Standard – early 1970s model, wine red finish, Bigsby vibrato tailpiece

Workman uses two amps on tour. The first amp is either a Fender Blues Deville, Fender Hot Rod Deville, or a Vox AC-30. Using an A/B/Y footswitch, he switches between this first amp and a Fender Pro Junior which he uses for guitar solos. He has stated that he uses no pedals with the exception of an MXR "Micro Amp" pedal used with the Vox AC-30.

Discography

* Only available at live shows or through the band's website. Digital copies are available from Zunior.com.

Production work

Albums that Workman has produced for other artists include:

John Southworth – Sedona Arizona – 1999
Paul MacLeod – Close and Play – 2000
The Cash Brothers – Phonebooth Tornado – 2000
Tegan and Sara – This Business of Art  – 2000
The Cash Brothers – How Was Tomorrow – 2001
Skydiggers – Bittersweet Harmony – 2002 – (produced 3 songs)
Sarah Slean – Night Bugs – 2002
Serena Ryder – Unlikely Emergency – 2003
Jeremy Fisher – Goodbye Blue Monday – 2006
Great Big Sea – Fortune's Favour – 2008
Hey Rosetta! – Into Your Lungs – 2008
Justin Rutledge – The Early Widows – 2010
Jeremy Fisher – Flood – 2010
Adaline – Modern Romantics – 2011
Carleton Stone – Carleton Stone – 2011

References

External links 
 Hawksley Workman
 

1975 births
Living people
Canadian rock singers
Canadian male singer-songwriters
Canadian singer-songwriters
Canadian record producers
Juno Award for Breakthrough Artist of the Year winners
People from Huntsville, Ontario
Male actors from Toronto
Musicians from Toronto
Canadian male film actors
21st-century Canadian male actors
21st-century Canadian male singers